Ann Cuneo (March 6, 1926 – June 26, 2012) was an American competition swimmer and two-time Olympic champion.

Ann Elisabeth Curtis was born in San Francisco, California, and began swimming at the age of 9 under the teaching of nuns while she and her sister spent two years at the Ursuline Convent boarding school in Santa Rosa. Eventually, she began training under Charlie Sava as a member of the San Francisco Crystal Plunge swimming club. In 1944, at age 18, she became the first woman, as well as the first swimmer, to receive the coveted James E. Sullivan Award, recognizing her as the outstanding American amateur athlete of the year.

Curtis competed at the 1948 Summer Olympics in London, England, winning a medal in every freestyle swimming race in which women were allowed to enter at the time. She won her first gold medal in the women's 400-meter freestyle, setting an Olympic record on the way to winning by a margin of nearly four seconds. In her next race, she received the silver medal for her second-place finish in the women's 100-meter freestyle, a disappointing finish for her. She would later say she felt like she "had let down the world."

However, her favorite moment of the Games came during the third event, when she won her second gold medal as a member of the women's 4×100-meter freestyle relay team. The United States was not favored to win, in part because she had placed second in the 100-meter individual event. When she took the water for the anchor leg in the relay, the United States team was in third place; she passed Johanna "Hannie" Termeulen of Holland and then Fritze Carstensen of Denmark to win the gold medal for the US by four-tenths of a second, setting another Olympic record in the process. When she returned to San Francisco, she was honored in a parade along Market Street.

During her career she set five world and 56 U.S. records. By the time she swam at the 1948 London Games, Curtis was engaged to be married to Gordon Cuneo, a former basketball player for Cal; they were married in 1949, and she chose not to train for the 1952 Games, also in part because she had accepted a car from the City of San Francisco upon her return from London, which made her a professional swimmer.

In 1959, after retiring from the sport, she opened the Ann Curtis Swim Club and School of Swimming with her husband. She was inducted into the International Swimming Hall of Fame in 1966, and the Bay Area Sports Hall of Fame in 1983. Curtis died at her home in San Rafael, California on June 26, 2012, aged 86.

See also
 List of members of the International Swimming Hall of Fame
 List of Olympic medalists in swimming (women)
 List of University of California, Berkeley alumni

References

External links

 
 
 

1926 births
2012 deaths
American female freestyle swimmers
James E. Sullivan Award recipients
Olympic gold medalists for the United States in swimming
Swimmers from San Francisco
Swimmers at the 1948 Summer Olympics
University of California, Berkeley alumni
Medalists at the 1948 Summer Olympics
Olympic silver medalists for the United States in swimming
21st-century American women